Alicia Loxley (née Gorey) is an Australian journalist and news presenter.

Loxley currently presents the following bulletins:
 Nine News Melbourne at 6pm on Fridays - Sundays
 Nine Afternoon News Melbourne at 4pm on Mondays and Tuesdays and
 Nine News First at Five, the national afternoon bulletin at 5pm on Weekends.

Career
Loxley was born in Melbourne and made her first media appearance on Radio National's The Sports Factor. From there she joined the ABC in Mildura. It was a stint as a reporter on Triple J radio that was the impetus for her move to Perth. 

Loxley presented her first ABC News bulletin in late 2003 and in 2005 she was appointed to the position of weekend news presenter on ABC News in Western Australia. 

In February 2006, she replaced Paul Lockyer as weeknight presenter of ABC News in Western Australia. In addition to presenting news each night, Loxley took on a new role at ABC Radio in mid-2007 where she hosted the statewide regional drive program on ABC Local Radio. 

Loxley resigned in May 2008 to move back to Melbourne and was replaced by Karina Carvalho.

In July 2008, Loxley joined Nine News Melbourne as a reporter.

In October 2009, Loxley filled in as presenter of Nine Afternoon News and Nine Late News. During the 2009/2010 summer period she also presented the news on Today, and on Nine News Melbourne.

In June 2010, she relocated to Sydney, where she replaced Amber Sherlock on Weekend Today as news presenter and was also the Monday news presenter on Today, as Georgie Gardner presents Nine News Sydney on Friday and Saturday.

In November 2010, she joined Shane Warne's variety program Warnie on the Nine Network. In December 2010, Loxley co-hosted Sydney New Year's Eve alongside Michael Usher and Jaynie Seal.

Loxley has also been a fill in news presenter for Nine News including presenting news updates on Kerri-Anne, Nine Morning News, Nine Afternoon News, Qantas Inflight News and Nine News Sydney news updates. She has also been a fill-in presenter for Leila McKinnon on Weekend Today and Lisa Wilkinson on Today.

In November 2011, it was announced that Loxley would replace Jo Hall as weekend presenter on Nine News Melbourne with Hall scaling back her commitments with the Nine Network. Deborah Knight replaced Loxley on Weekend Today and Today. Loxley has also filled in for Peter Hitchener on the weeknight edition of Nine News Melbourne, Tracy Grimshaw on A Current Affair and Sylvia Jeffreys and Lisa Wilkinson on Today.

In May 2017, Loxley was appointed presenter of Nine Afternoon News Melbourne, a local weekday afternoon news bulletin which replaced the national Nine Afternoon News bulletin.

In December 2021, it was announced that Peter Hitchener will scale back to 4 days a week from January 2022 presenting from Monday to Thursday with Loxley presenting on Friday.

Loxley is currently a fill in presenter on 3AW.

Personal life
Loxley married in 2012, and has three children.

References

Australian television journalists
ABC News (Australia) presenters
Nine News presenters
1981 births
Living people
Television personalities from Melbourne
Journalists from Melbourne
People educated at Loyola College
RMIT University alumni